Stefano Chiesa (born 25 May 1996) is an Italian athlete who specialises in race walking.

From Verbania, he had achieved the Olympic qualifying standard for the 50 km race walk in October 2019 in the Tilburg 50 km, with a time of 3:48:25. In November 2019 however, he injured a metatarsal in a national training camp in Tuscany. The time he recorded was described as remarkable as it was 23 minutes faster than his previous best time of 4:11:07. Chiesa was named in the Italian squad for the World Race Walking Championships in 2022 held in Muscat.

References

1996 births
Living people
Italian male racewalkers
People from Verbania
Sportspeople from the Province of Verbano-Cusio-Ossola